Sochi is the largest resort city in Russia. The city is situated on the Sochi River, along the Black Sea in Southern Russia, with a population of 466,078 residents, up to 600,000 residents in the urban area. Sochi stretches across , and is the longest city in Europe, the fifth-largest city in the Southern Federal District, the second-largest city in Krasnodar Krai, and the sixth-largest city on the Black Sea.

Being a part of the Caucasian Riviera, it is one of the very few places in Russia with a subtropical climate, with warm to hot summers and mild to cool winters.

Sochi hosted the XXII Olympic Winter Games and XI Paralympic Winter Games in 2014. It hosted the alpine and Nordic Olympic events at the nearby ski resort of Rosa Khutor in Krasnaya Polyana. It also hosted the Formula 1 Russian Grand Prix from 2014 until 2021. It was also one of the host cities for the 2018 FIFA World Cup.

Etymology 
The general consensus (also recognized by the city's own website) is that the name "Sochi" is the Russified form of the Circassian "Ş̂açə" which in turn is of Ubykh-Circassian origin, coming from the Ubykh name "Ş̂uaça". It is a compound made up from the two Ubykh words "шъуа" (sea) and "ча" (side) and roughly translates to "Seaside/coast". There are other claims and theories, according to Georgian sources, the word comes from the Georgian word for "fir", "soch'i".

History

Early history 
Before the whole area was conquered by Cimmerian, Scythian and Sarmatian invaders, the Zygii (Proto-Adyghe) people lived in Lesser Abkhazia under the Kingdom of Pontus, then the Roman Empire's influence in antiquity. From the 6th to the 11th centuries, the area successively belonged to the Georgian kingdoms of Lazica and Abkhazia, who built a dozen churches within the city boundaries, the later was unified under the single Georgian monarchy in 11th-century, forming one of the Saeristavo, known as Tskhumi extending its possessions up to Nicopsis. The Christian settlements along the coast were destroyed by the invading Alans, Khazars, Mongols and other nomadic empires whose control of the region was slight. The northern wall of an 11th-century Byzantine basilica still stands in the Loo Microdistrict.

Between the 13th and 15th centuries, the Republic of Genoa had the monopoly of the trade on the shores of the Black Sea, and established colonies and trading posts in the region of the present-day Sochi, the large ones were Layso and Costa.

From the 14th to the 19th centuries, the region was dominated by the Abkhaz, Ubykh and Adyghe tribes, the current location of the city of Sochi (Ş̂açə) known as Ubykhia was part of historical Circassia, and was controlled by the native people of the local mountaineer clans of the north-west Caucasus, nominally under the sovereignty of the Ottoman Empire, which was their principal trading partner in the Islamic world.

Russian Empire 
The coastline was ceded to Russia in 1829 as a result of the Russo-Circassian War and the Russo-Turkish War, 1828–1829; however, the Circassians did not accept the Russian control over Circassia and kept resisting the newly established Russian outposts along the Circassian coast. Provision of weapons and ammunition from abroad to the Circassians caused a diplomatic conflict between the Russian Empire and the British Empire that occurred in 1836 over the mission of the Vixen.

The Russians had no detailed knowledge of the area until Baron Feodor Tornau investigated the coastal route from Gelendzhik to Gagra, and across the mountains to Kabarda, in the 1830s. In 1838, the fort of Alexandria, renamed Navaginsky a year later, was founded at the mouth of the Sochi River as part of the Black Sea coastal line, a chain of seventeen fortifications set up to protect the area from recurring Circassian resistance. At the outbreak of the Crimean War, the garrison was evacuated from Navaginsky in order to prevent its capture by the Turks, who effected a landing on Cape Adler soon after.

The last battle of the Russo-Circassian War, the Battle of Qbaada, took place in 1864 and the Dakhovsky fort was established on the site of the Navaginsky fort. The end of Caucasian War was proclaimed at Qbaada tract (modern Krasnaya Polyana) on June 2 (21 May O.S.), 1864, by the manifesto of Emperor Alexander II read aloud by Grand Duke Michael Nikolaevich of Russia. The city was the administrative capital of the Sochinsky Okrug.

Circassian genocide 

By the end of Russo-Circassian War, the Russian Empire aimed to systematically destroy the native Circassian people in the region and several atrocities were committed by the Russian forces. As a result, almost all Ubykhs and a major part of the Circassians who lived on the territory of modern Sochi, were either killed or expelled to the Ottoman Empire in the Circassian Genocide. According to Russian sources, Sochi's population fell from roughly 100,000, to 98.

Starting in 1866 the coast was actively colonized by Russians, Armenians, Ukrainians, Belorussians, Greeks, Germans, Georgians and other people from inner Russia.

In 1874–1891, the first Russian Orthodox church, St. Michael's Church, was constructed, and the Dakhovsky settlement was renamed Dakhovsky Posad on April 13, 1874 (O.S.). In February 1890, the Sochi Lighthouse was constructed. In 1896, the Dakhovsky Posad was renamed Sochi Posad (after the name of local river) and incorporated into the newly formed Black Sea Governorate. In 1900–1910, Sochi burgeoned into a sea resort. The first resort, "Kavkazskaya Riviera", opened on June 14, 1909 (O.S.). Sochi was granted town status in 1917.

Soviet time
During the Russian Civil War, the littoral area saw sporadic armed clashes involving the Red Army, White movement forces, and the Democratic Republic of Georgia. As a result of the war Sochi has become Russian territory. In 1923, Sochi acquired one of its most distinctive features, a railway which runs from Tuapse to Georgia within a kilometer or two of the coastline. Although this branch of the Northern Caucasus Railway may appear somewhat incongruous in the setting of beaches and sanatoriums, it is still operational and vital to the region's transportation infrastructure.

Sochi was established as a fashionable resort area under Joseph Stalin, who had his favorite dacha built in the city. Stalin's study, complete with a wax statue of the leader, is now open to the public. During Stalin's reign the coast became dotted with imposing Neoclassical buildings, exemplified by the opulent Rodina and Ordzhonikidze sanatoriums. The centerpiece of this early period is Shchusev's Constructivist Institute of Rheumatology (1927–1931). The area was continuously developed until the demise of the Soviet Union.

Modern Russia 
Following Russia's loss of the traditionally popular resorts of the Crimean Peninsula (transferred from the Russian SFSR to the Ukrainian SSR in 1954 by Nikita Khrushchev), Sochi emerged as the unofficial summer capital of the country. In 1961, Soviet officials decided to expand the city limits by forming a Greater Sochi which extended for 140 kilometers from the southern parts of Tuapse to Adler. In July 2005, Russia submitted a successful bid for hosting the 2014 Winter Olympics in the city, spending around $51 billion in the process. Additionally, Sochi has also served as the location for the signing of many treaties, especially those between Georgia and the breakaway regions of Abkhazia and South Ossetia governing authorities.

In 2019, an area in the Imereti Lowlands was divided from Adlersky City District and formed as a separate urban-type settlement named Sirius. It was later designated as a federal territory.

Geography 

The city of Sochi borders with Tuapsinsky District in the northwest, with Apsheronsky District and with Maykopsky District of the Republic of Adygea in the north, with Mostovsky District in the northeast, and with Georgia/Abkhazia in the southeast. From the southwest, it is bordered by the Black Sea.

The vast majority of the population of Sochi lives in a narrow strip along the coast and is organized in independent microdistricts (formerly settlements). The biggest of these microdistricts, from the northwest to the southeast, are Lazarevskoye, Loo, Dagomys, central Sochi (Tsentralny City District), Khosta, Matsesta, and Adler. The whole city is located on the slopes of the Western Caucasus which descend to the Black Sea and are cut by the rivers. The biggest rivers in Sochi are the Mzymta, which is in fact the longest Black Sea tributary in Russia, and the Shakhe. Other rivers include the Ashe, the Psezuapse, the Sochi, the Khosta, and the Matsesta. The Psou River makes the border with Abkhazia.

The northeastern part of the city belongs to the Caucasian Biosphere Reserve which is a World Heritage Site spanning vast areas in Krasnodar Krai and Adygea. Almost the whole area of the Greater Sochi, with the exception of the coast and of the area which belong to the Caucasian Biosphere Reserve, are included into Sochi National Park.

Layout and landmarks 
Sochi is unique among larger Russian cities as having some aspects of a subtropical resort. Apart from the scenic Caucasus Mountains, pebble and sand beaches, the city attracts vacation-goers with its subtropical vegetation, numerous parks, monuments, and extravagant Stalinist architecture. About two million people visit Greater Sochi each summer, when the city is home to the annual film festival "Kinotavr" and a getaway for Russia's elite.

A UNESCO World Heritage Site, the  Caucasian Biosphere Reserve, lies just north from the city. Sochi also has the region's most northerly tea plantations.

Climate 

Sochi has a humid subtropical climate (Köppen climate classification Cfa), at the lower elevations. Yearly sunshine hours are around 2,200. Generally, the summer season lasts three months, from June to September. Sochi lies at 8b/9a hardiness zone, so the city supports different types of palm trees. Sochi is situated on the same latitude as Nice but strong cold winds from Asia make winters less warm. In fact, temperatures drop below freezing every winter.

Administrative and municipal status and city divisions

Within the framework of administrative divisions, it is, together with one urban-type settlement (Krasnaya Polyana) and seventy-nine rural localities, incorporated as the City of Sochi—an administrative unit with the status equal to that of the districts. As a municipal division, the City of Sochi is incorporated as Sochi Urban Okrug.

Sochi is administratively subdivided into four city districts: Tsentralny City District, Lazarevsky City District, Khostinsky City District, and Adlersky City District. Tsentralny City District, comprising the central portion of, is by far the smallest out of four in terms of the area, and the other three have comparable areas, with Lazarevsky City District being the biggest. In terms of the population, Tsentralny City District is approximately twice as big as each of the other three city districts.

Tsentralny City District

The highlights include:
Michael Archangel Cathedral, a diminutive church built in 1873–1891 to Kaminsky's designs in order to commemorate the victorious conclusion of the Caucasian War.
The red-granite Archangel Column, erected in 2006 in memory of the Russian soldiers fallen in Sochi during the Caucasian War. It is capped by a 7-metre bronze statue of Sochi's patron saint, Michael the Archangel.
Sochi Art Museum occupies a large building with a four-columned portico, completed in 1939. The Neoclassical design is by Ivan Zholtovsky.
Sochi Arboretum, a large botanical garden with tropical trees from many countries, and the Mayors Alleé—a landscape avenue of palm trees planted by mayors from cities around the world.
The Tree of Friendship, a hybrid citrus tree planted in 1934 in the Subtropical Botanic Garden. Since 1940 numerous citrus cultivars from foreign countries have been grafted onto this tree as a token of friendship and peace. The associated Friendship Tree Garden Museum has a collection of 20,000 commemorative presents from around the world.
The Winter Theater (1934–1937) is another rigorously Neoclassical edifice, surrounded by 88 Corinthian columns, with a pediment bearing the statues of Terpsichore, Melpomene and Thalia, all three cast by Vera Mukhina.
Hall of Organ and Chamber Music. Located centrally in the city of Sochi it conducts organ, symphony, chamber-ensemble, choral, vocal music concerts. All year round the Sochi Symphony Orchestra, local actors of the city art groups, famous Russian and international performers, International Contests Winners and Laureates give concerts here.
The Maritime Passenger Terminal (1955) is notable for its distinctive 71-meter-high steepled tower and four statues symbolizing the cardinal points.
The Railway Station (1952) is one of the most remarkable buildings of Sochi.
The Riviera Park was established by Vasily Alexeyevich Khludov in 1883 in the part of the city which later became known as Khludovskaya. The park is popular with tourists and local residents alike. It has a variety of attractions, including an outcrop of funny statues and a "glade of friendship" where magnolia trees were planted by every Soviet cosmonaut, among other notables.

Lazarevsky City District

Lazarevsky City District lies to the northwest from the city center; the 2010 Census showed the population of 63,894 people.
Lazarevskoye,  from the city center, contains a delphinarium, an old church (1903), and a new church (1999). The settlement was founded as a Russian military outpost in 1839 and was named after Admiral Mikhail Lazarev.
Loo,  from the city center, was once owned by Princes Loov, a noble Abkhazian family. The district contains the ruins of a medieval church, founded in the 8th century, rebuilt in the 11th century, and converted into a fortress in the Late Middle Ages.
Dagomys,  from the city center, has been noted for its botanical garden, established by order of Nicholas II, as well as tea plantations and factories. A sprawling hotel complex was opened there in 1982. Dagomys adjoins Bocharov Ruchey, a dacha built for Kliment Voroshilov in the 1950s, but later upgraded into a country residence of the President of Russia, where he normally spends his vacations and often confers with leaders of other states.
Golovinka is a historic location at the mouth of the Shakhe River. Formerly marking the border between the Ubykhs and the Shapsugs, the settlement was noted by Italian travelers of the 17th century as Abbasa. On May 3, 1838, it was the site of the Subashi landing of the Russians, who proceeded to construct Fort Golovinsky where many convicted Decembrists used to serve. The fort was intentionally destroyed by Russian forces at the beginning of the Crimean War, so as to avoid its capture by the enemy.
Fort Godlik, of which little remains, had a turbulent history. It was built at the mouth of the Godlik River in the Byzantine period (5th to 8th centuries), was destroyed by the Khazars and revived by the Genoese in the High Middle Ages.

Khostinsky City District

The district is traversed by many rivulets which give their names to the microdistricts of Matsesta ("flame-colored river"), Kudepsta, and Khosta ("the river of boars").

Adlersky City District

Until the establishment of Greater Sochi in 1961, it was administered as a separate town, which had its origin in an ancient Sadz village and a medieval Genoese trading post.

Among the natural wonders of the district is the Akhshtyr Gorge with a 160-meter-long cave that contains traces of human habitation from about 30,000 years ago. The upland part of the district includes a network of remote mountain villages (auls), the Estonian colony at Estosadok, and the ski resort of Krasnaya Polyana which hosted the events (Alpine and Nordic) of the 2014 Winter Olympics.

Also located here are the largest trout fishery in Russia (founded in 1964) and a breeding nursery for great apes.

Demographics
Sochi has an ethnic Russian majority (~70%). The city is home to a sizable Armenian minority (~20%), which is especially notable in the Adlersky City District where they compose more than half of the total population. Most of Sochi's Armenian community are descendants of Hamshen Armenians from Turkey's northeastern Black Sea coast, who began arriving in the late 19th century. The rest are Armenians from Georgia (particularly from Abkhazia and Samtskhe-Javakheti) and Armenia (especially from Shirak Province due to the 1988 earthquake).

Religion

The Byzantine Empire brought Christianity to the Sochi region in the Middle Ages. The region was relatively isolated before 1829. In the North, a few hundred Sunni Muslim Shapsugs, a part of the Circassian nation, lived around Tkhagapsh, near Lazarevskoye. The Circassians (also known as Adyghe) converted to Islam from Christianity in the 17th century. In the nineteenth century, Islam spread to the region.

Currently, Sochi is a large predominantly Christian city, though there are thought to be around 20,000 Muslims (5% of inhabitants) living there now (the majority are Adyghe) plus other Eastern Caucasians, Turks, Tatars, and other smaller Muslim groups.

There are around thirty Russian Orthodox churches, the largest being St. Michael's, and two monasteries, plus two Catholic churches, one in the center of Sochi and the other in Lazarevskoye. The Armenian community, which is important in Sochi, gathers in about ten churches.

Economy

Overview 

Sochi is an important economic centre of Krasnodar Krai and Russia. According to the economist-geographer Natalia Zubarevich, Sochi, being a "recreational capital", along with the largest industrial centers, acts as a "motor" of development that determines the prospects and directions of the country's development. The economy of Sochi is based on trade, construction, resort and tourism. Its structure for 2015: retail trade (59%), construction (15%), resorts and tourism (11%), industry (10.6%), transport (3.5%) and agriculture (0.9%). Sochi is one of the most popular tourism centres, as well as a prominent financial centre in Russia. Investments in the city's economy over the past 10 years have amounted to more than 1.1 trillion rubles. The turnover of medium and large enterprises in Sochi in 2017 amounted to more than 191.3 billion rubles. The increase in turnover in comparison with the previous year is 12%.

Experts appreciate the city's contribution to the Russian economy, often including it in the development and investment attractiveness ratings. In 2010, Sochi headed the "Rating of Russian cities by quality of life" of the Urbanika Institute, and in 2014 and 2015 it ranked as 4th and 5th city respectively; experts noted the high rate of development of the city, large-scale investments on the eve of the 2014 Winter Olympics, favorable environmental conditions and high safety of residents. In 2012, Sochi topped the rating of "30 best cities for business" in Russia, by Forbes.

Tourism 
Today, Sochi is an all-season resort of an international level; 705 classified accommodation facilities operate on its territory, including: 66 sanatoriums, 20 boarding houses and recreation centers and 618 hotels. 183 beach areas have been opened, more than 100 tourist facilities operate, about 70 excursion companies operate.

In recent years, there has been a steady increase in tourist traffic. Over 5.2 million tourists visited Sochi in 2016, 5.9% more than in 2015. The average annual occupancy rate of hotels is at 77%, but varies by season. The importance of tourism for the development of Sochi is also determined by the financial revenues from the industry. According to statistics, in 2015, tourism revenues amounted to about 30 billion rubles. At the same time, throughout the country, revenues from the industry amounted to 161 billion rubles; thus, the tourist industry of the city occupies 18.6% of the total market of the country.

Trade, finance and services 
The retail trade turnover for medium and large enterprises (accounting for about 30% of the total turnover) in the city in 2016 amounted to 57.2 billion rubles. On the territory of the city there are 8,769 objects of the consumer sphere, of which: 5013 are stationary retail enterprises, 1450 are catering enterprises, 335 are wholesale enterprises, and 1083 are service enterprises. In Sochi, 1807 grocery stores, 2,708 non-food stores, 294 stores of a mixed group of goods, 178 pharmacies, 16 car dealerships, 20 stores at gas stations, 945 pavilions and kiosks have been opened.

According to 2017 data, the annual trade turnover per capita in Sochi is 1.75 times higher than the average in Russia (373,527 rubles per year per person). At the same time, it exceeds the annual trade turnover per capita in all cities with a population of over one million, including Saint Petersburg and Moscow. A high trade turnover is ensured by both a large flow of tourists and a high average wage in the city. The annual retail turnover generated by permanent residents is about 96.2 billion rubles (52%). Tourists generate about 87.83 billion rubles (48%).

The turnover of public catering in the city in 2016 for medium and large enterprises amounted to 7 billion rubles (about 36% of the total turnover). 1450 public catering establishments were opened in Sochi, with a total of 90473 seats. The market of paid services to the population in 2016 amounted to 34.3 million rubles; the industry employs 3393 people, with a total of 1083 enterprises.

Industry and agriculture 
The volume of goods shipped in 2016 for medium and large industrial enterprises of the city amounted to 19.4 billion rubles. The distribution of energy, gas and water accounted for 11.9 billion rubles, the largest enterprises in the industry are: Adler TPP and Sochinskaya TPP. Processing industries accounted for 3.3 billion rubles. The volume of shipment of minerals amounted to 76 million rubles, the largest enterprise in the industry is Firma Sochinerud.

In the manufacturing industry, the overwhelming share of food production enterprises, which account for 92.3% of the production volume. Large enterprises: Sochi meat-packing plant, Trout-breeding farm, Primorskaya quail farm, Sochi bakery and Lazarevsky bakery.

The volume of shipped agricultural products in 2016 amounted to 49.8 million rubles. Vegetables, citrus fruits, fruits (including heat-loving crops such as feijoa, medlar, kiwi) and flowers are cultivated by large agricultural enterprises: Verlioka, Voskhod and Pobeda. The only producer of poultry meat is the Adler Poultry Factory. Five enterprises are engaged in the cultivation and processing of tea: Dagomyschay, Solokhaul tea, Matsesta tea, Khosta tea, Shapsug tea and a number of farmers.

Education 

There are more than 70 secondary schools in Sochi.

In addition to branches of well-known metropolitan universities, Sochi has its own higher educational institutions, which are also of federal importance:

Sochi State University
Russian International Olympic University
Sochi Institute of Peoples' Friendship University of Russia
International Innovation University
Sochi Institute of Fashion, Business and Law
Sochi Maritime Institute
Sochi Branch of the Russian State Social University
Sochi Branch of the Russian State University of Justice
Sochi Branch of the Moscow New Law Institute
Sochi Branch of the Moscow Automobile and Highway State Technical University
Sochi Branch of the Adyghe State University
Secondary specialized educational institutions:

College of Economics and Technology at Sochi State University
College of Art
College of Multicultural Education
Medical College
Professional Technical School
Kuban College of Law
Sochi Financial and Law College
Sochi College of Humanities and Economics

Science 
Sochi is indispensable for Russian science from a geographical and climatic point of view. The only subtropics in Russia are actively used as a base for scientific research in the field of botany, medicine and coastal construction. In addition to higher education institutions that develop science, Sochi has a number of research institutions of all-Russian importance:

Sochi Research Center of the Russian Academy of Sciences
Research Institute of Medical Primatology, Russian Academy of Medical Sciences
Research Institute of Mountain Forestry and Forest Ecology of the Ministry of Natural Resources of the Russian Federation
All-Russian Scientific Research Institute of Floriculture and Subtropical Crops of the Russian Academy of Agricultural Sciences
Sochi Branch of the Russian Geographical Society

Sports

Sports facilities 
Sochi is also known for its sport facilities: a local tennis school spawned the careers of such notable players as Grand Slam champions Maria Sharapova and Yevgeny Kafelnikov (Kafelnikov spent much of his childhood here, while Sharapova relocated to Florida at the age of seven). In late 2005, the Russian Football Union announced that it was planning to establish a year-round training center for the country's national teams in Sochi. The city's warm climate was cited as one of the main incentives. Sochi is also the home for the football team PFC Sochi which plays in the Russian Premier League and for the ice hockey team HC Sochi which plays in the Kontinental Hockey League.

2014 Winter Olympics and Paralympics

The nearby ski resort of Roza Khutor at Krasnaya Polyana was the location of the alpine and Nordic events for the 2014 Winter Olympics.

In June 2006, the International Olympic Committee announced that Sochi had been selected as a finalist city to host the 2014 Winter Olympics and the 2014 Winter Paralympics. On July 4, 2007, Sochi was announced as the host city of the 2014 Winter Games, edging out Pyeongchang, South Korea and Salzburg, Austria.

This was Russia's first time hosting the Winter Olympic Games, and its first time hosting the Paralympic Games. The site of a training centre for aspiring Olympic athletes, in 2008, the city had no world-class level athletic facilities fit for international competition. Severe cost overruns made the 2014 Winter Olympics the most expensive Olympics in history; with Russian politician Boris Nemtsov citing allegations of corruption among government officials, and Allison Stewart of the Saïd Business School at Oxford citing tight relationships between the government and construction firms. While originally budgeted at US$12 billion, various factors caused the budget to expand to US$51 billion, surpassing the estimated $44 billion cost of the 2008 Summer Olympics in Beijing. According to a report by the European Bank for Reconstruction and Development, this cost will not boost Russia's national economy, but may attract business to Sochi and the southern Krasnodar region of Russia in the future as a result of improved services.

The 2014 Winter Olympics in Sochi saw concern and controversy following a new federal law approved in Russia in June 2013 that bans "homosexual propaganda to minors". There were also concerns over Islamist militants.

Construction work

The state-controlled RAO UES announced in July 2007 that it might spend 30 billion roubles (about US$1.2 billion) on upgrading the electrical power system in the Sochi area by 2014. The power generating companies Inter RAO UES and RusHydro would have to build or modernize four thermal power plants and four hydroelectric plants—and the federal grid company FGC UES has to replace the Central-Shepsi electricity transmission line, which reportedly often fails in bad weather. The new power line would run partly on power towers and partly across the bottom of the Black Sea. By 2011, the power supply of the resort area would increase by 1129 MW—of which 300 MW would be used for Olympic sports facilities. "The cost of the work is estimated at 83.6 billion rubles (about US $3.26 billion), of which 50 billion rubles (about US$2 billion) will go to investments in the electricity grid," the power companies announced. They did not say how much of the bill the state would foot. In February 2007, when UES had planned to spend 48.8 billion rubles (about US$1.9 billion) on the Sochi area, the share the state had been ready to pay 38 billion roubles (about US$1.48 billion) of that.

Other sports events

The Silk Way Rally which is part of Dakar series took place in Sochi in 2010 for the last stage between the capital of the Republic of Adygea Maykop to the city of Sochi through Pseshwap.

President Vladimir Putin reached a deal with Bernie Ecclestone for the city to host the Formula One Russian Grand Prix from 2014. However, because of the 2022 Russian invasion of Ukraine, Sochi is not allowed to host future races.

The World Robot Olympiad took place in the Adler Arena Skating Center on November 21–23, 2014.

The 2014 World Chess Championship between Viswanathan Anand and Magnus Carlsen was played in Sochi in November 2014, with Carlsen emerging as the winner.

The Fisht Olympic Stadium was also used to host 2018 FIFA World Cup football matches.

Since 2014, the city has hosted HC Sochi, who play at the Bolshoy Ice Dome in the Kontinental Hockey League, the biggest ice hockey league in Russia and eastern Europe.

Transportation 

Public transport is represented mainly by bus and taxi. Sochi is served by the Adler-Sochi International Airport. Types of non-mass public transport include two funiculars (at the Central military sanatorium and Ordzhonikidze resort) and three cable cars (at arboretum sanatorium "Dawn" and pension "Neva") also has several cableways in Krasnaya Polyana.

The Sochi Port terminal building was built in 1955 by Karo Alabyan and Leonid Karlik in Stalinist architecture. It is topped with a 71-meter steepled tower. Sculptures embodying seasons and cardinal points are set above the tower's three tiers.

Five of the railway stations of Sochi were renovated for the 2014 Winter Olympics. These are Dagomys, Sochi, Matsesta and Khosta railway stations. In Adler city district of Sochi, the original railway station was preserved and new railway station was built near it. Another new railway station was built in Estosadok, close to Krasnaya Polyana.

At some point, plans to construct the light metro network to serve the Olympics were considered; however, the Sochi Light Metro plan was abandoned in favor of the reconstruction of the railway.

Notable people

Yuri Nikolaevich Denisyuk, physicist
Mikhail Galustyan, comedian
Andre Geim, physicist, graphene researcher and 2010 Nobel Prize winner
Yevgeny Kafelnikov, tennis player, former World No. 1 tennis player
Daria Kondakova, rhythmic gymnast
Grigory Leps, singer, songwriter, musician of Georgian origin
Slava Metreveli, Georgian/Soviet association football player
Vladimir Nemshilov, Olympic swimmer
Boris Nemtsov, politician
Mordechai Spiegler, Russian-Israeli association football player and manager
Vladimir Tkachenko, basketball player
Elena Vesnina, tennis player
Kharis Yunichev, the first Soviet male swimmer to win an Olympic medal
Anna Zak, Israeli celebrity

Twin towns – sister cities

Sochi is twinned with:

 Baden-Baden, Germany (2011)
 Long Beach, United States (1990)
 Menton, France (1966)
 Nagato, Japan (2018)
 Pärnu, Estonia (1994)
 Rimini, Italy (1977)
 Trabzon, Turkey (1991)
 Weihai, China (1996)

Former twin towns
 Cheltenham, United Kingdom (1959) - Suspended due to the ongoing Russian invasion of Ukraine.
 Espoo, Finland (1989-2022)

See also
Federation Island
Sochi Police

References

Notes

Sources

Historical Dictionary of Sochi,  [Currently the only major work on the city in English.]

External links

Official website of Sochi
Official website of Sochi 
Secrieru, Stanislav: "The 2014 Winter Olympic Games in Sochi: Implications for the Caucasus" in the Caucasus Analytical Digest No.19
Weather Report for Sochi, Russia
Sochi at funiq.eu

 
1838 establishments in the Russian Empire
Black Sea Governorate
History of Kuban
Populated coastal places in Russia
Populated places established in 1838
Port cities of the Black Sea
Seaside resorts in Russia
Spa towns in Russia
Cities and towns in Krasnodar Krai